Heilhornet  is a mountain in the municipality of Bindal in Nordland, Norway. The Norwegian County Road 17 runs along the western base of the mountain.

References

Mountains of Nordland
Bindal